The Ho Leung Ho Lee Foundation (HLHL) is a Hong Kong-based non-government organisation which annually bestows prizes upon Chinese scientists. It was established on 30 March 1994, with funds donated from the charitable foundations of Ho Sin Hang (He Shanheng), Leung Kau-Kui (梁銶琚, Liang Qiuju), Ho Tim (何添, He Tian), and Lee Quo-wei (Li Guowei).

Foundation awards

 Science and Technology Achievement Award 
 Science and Technology Progress Award
  Science and Technology Innovation Award

Past winners of awards includes:

Han Zhanwen 2016
Ma Weiming 2015

References

External links

Xinhua: HLHL Foundation awards Chinese scientists in 2011

Science and technology in China
Charities based in Hong Kong
1994 establishments in Hong Kong
Organizations established in 1994